Chalamatti is a village in Dharwad district of Karnataka, India.

Demographics
As of the 2011 Census of India there were 180 households in Chalamatti and a total population of 862 consisting of 461 males and 401 females. There were 116 children ages 0-6.

References

Villages in Dharwad district